The Mogollon Mountains or Mogollon Range ( or ) are a mountain range in Grant County and Catron County of southwestern New Mexico, in the Southwestern United States. They are primarily protected within the Gila National Forest.

Geography
The Mogollon Mountains are located west of the Gila River and east of the San Francisco River, between the communities of Reserve and Silver City. The Sierra Aguilada, a lower altitude smaller range, borders to the west of Route 180. Most of the Mogollon Mountains range is protected within the Gila Wilderness, in the Gila National Forest.

The range also contains five other peaks over 10,000 feet, most notably Mogollon Baldy .

Geology
The Mogollon Mountains were formed between forty and twenty-five million years ago as part of the Datil-Mogollon Volcanic Plateau. Hot springs existing in the area are a remnant of that volcanic activity.

History
The Mogollon Mountains are named for Juan Ignacio Flores Mogollón, governor of Spanish colonial Nuevo Leon from 1712 to 1715, in the Viceroyalty of New Spain.

Early inhabitants of the range include the Mimbres Culture, from 300 BCE to 1300 CE. Later peoples included the Chiricahua and Mimbres bands of the Apache. Geronimo is said to have been born in the area around 1829.

Mining occurred in the area beginning in the 1890s and continuing for some decades when the natural grizzly bear population was destroyed.

References

Mountain ranges of New Mexico
Landforms of Catron County, New Mexico
Mountain ranges of Grant County, New Mexico
Gila National Forest